Winnipeg North was a provincial electoral division in Manitoba, Canada.  It existed on two separate occasions.

It was initially created for the 1883 provincial election, and abolished with the 1920 election when Winnipeg became a single, ten-member constituency.

Winnipeg North was re-established for the elections of 1949 and 1953 as a four-member constituency.  In 1958, it was divided into several single-member constituencies.

Winnipeg North (original constituency)
The Winnipeg North constituency was created for the 1883 election, when the original Winnipeg constituency was divided into two sections: Winnipeg North and Winnipeg South.  It was a single-member constituency until the 1914 election, when it returned two members.  Electors of Winnipeg North were allowed to cast ballots for two seats, which were called "Winnipeg North A" and "Winnipeg North B".

In the early 20th century, Winnipeg North became known for its large working-class and immigrant communities.  Many electors were recent immigrants from Eastern Europe, who profoundly changed the area's political character.

Solomon Hart Green, elected in 1910, was the first Jewish Canadian to serve in a Canadian provincial legislature.  Richard Rigg, returned in 1915 for Winnipeg North "B", was the first Social Democrat elected in Manitoba.

Members of the Legislative Assembly for Winnipeg North

Members of the Legislative Assembly for Winnipeg North "A"

Members of the Legislative Assembly for Winnipeg North "B"

Winnipeg North (re-established)
The single constituency of Winnipeg was divided into three sections for the 1949 election: Winnipeg North, Winnipeg Centre and Winnipeg South.  All three constituencies elected four members to the legislature, with electors choosing members by a single transferable ballot.

Winnipeg North had very prominent Jewish and Ukrainian communities in this period, and was by far the most left-wing section of the city.  Bill Kardash, Manitoba's only Communist Member of the Legislative Assembly (MLA), was returned for Winnipeg North in both 1949 and 1953.  The socialist Cooperative Commonwealth Federation was the area's dominant party, and returned two members in both elections.

The constituency was eliminated at the 1958 election, when Manitoba abolished its multi-member seats.  Several single-member constituencies were created in its place.

Members of the Legislative Assembly for Winnipeg North (1949-1958)

Election results

1883 general election

1886 general election

1888 general election

1892 general election

1896 general election

1899 general election

1903 general election

1907 general election

1910 general election

1914 general election

Winnipeg North A

Winnipeg North B

1915 general election

Winnipeg North A

Winnipeg North B

1918 by-election

1949 general election

1953 general election

References 

Former provincial electoral districts of Manitoba